Alwin Clarence Dalitz (18 May 1894 – 29 January 1969) was an Australian rules footballer who played for the Fitzroy Football Club in the Victorian Football League (VFL).

References

External links 
		

1894 births
1969 deaths
Australian rules footballers from Victoria (Australia)
Fitzroy Football Club players